Wilda Bennett (December 19, 1894 – December 20, 1967) was an American actress in musical comedies and in film. Her tumultuous personal life also kept her in the headlines.

Early life
Bennett was born in Asbury Park, New Jersey. Bennett's father was John H. Bennett, a city building inspector.

Career
Bennett's Broadway credits included Everywoman (1911-1912), A Good Little Devil (1913), The Only Girl (1914-1915), The Riviera Girl (1917), The Girl Behind the Gun (1918-1919), Apple Blossoms (1919-1920), Music Box Revue (1921-1922), The Lady in Ermine (1922-1923), and the title role in Madame Pompadour (1924-1925). 
She had a "sweet" soprano voice.
Bennett's later stage appearances were in Lovely Lady (1928), and Merrily We Roll Along (1934). She reprised her title role in The Only Girl for a radio production in 1927.

Films featuring Wilda Bennett included A Good Little Devil (1914, lost), Love, Honor and Obey (1920), Bullets or Ballots (1936), Dark Victory (1939), The Women (1939), What a Life (1939), Ninotchka (1939), Those Were the Days! (1940), and The Lady Eve (1941).

Personal life
Bennett's personal life involved multiple legal troubles that brought additional, ongoing, national press attention. In 1925, she was sued for $100,000 by a woman named Katherine Frey, who believed that Bennett had been her husband Charles Frey's lover. Katherine Frey won a judgment of $25,000 in the case. While the lawsuit was still pending, Charles Frey was driving Bennett's car when it struck a young woman, who was killed. Bennett was a passenger in the car. In 1927 she was sued for the care expenses of a horse she once owned. In 1928 she was sued for damages by a landlord who said Bennett destroyed furniture and removed other items from an apartment she rented. Bennett lost that case too, and had to pay $400 to her landlord. In 1930, she sued Anthony J. Wettach after another car accident; she ended up marrying him instead. In 1932, she was arrested on charges of being drunk and disorderly.

Bennett was married four times. Her husbands were, in order, producer Robert Schable (divorced in 1920), Argentine dancer Abraham "Peppy" de Albrew (married 1926, separated in 1927),  Anthony J. Wettach (married 1930, divorced 1933), and mining engineer Munro Whitmore. Bennett was widowed when Munro Whitmore died in 1960. 

On December 20, 1967, one day after Bennett's 73rd birthday, she died in Winnemucca, Nevada.

References

External links

Wilda Bennett's listing at IBDB
Wilda Bennett's listing at AllMusic
An undated photograph of Wilda Bennett in the Billy Rose Theatre Collection Photograph File, New York Public Library Digital Collections
A 1926 photograph of Wilda Bennett in the J. Willis Sayre Collection of Theatrical Photographs, University of Washington Libraries, Digital Collections

1894 births
1967 deaths
American stage actresses
American film actresses
American silent film actresses
Actresses from New Jersey
People from Asbury Park, New Jersey
20th-century American actresses